Achilles 1894 is a football club from Assen in Drenthe, Netherlands. Achilles 1894 plays in the 2017–18 Sunday Hoofdklasse A.

Achilles won the championship of North Netherlands in 1939 and qualified for the National championship play off competition where they finished 5th.

Achilles was the first club from Drenthe who played in the National championship play off competition. FC Emmen became the second club of Drenthe to do so in the season 2018–2019.

References

External links
 Official site

Football clubs in the Netherlands
Association football clubs established in 1894
1894 establishments in the Netherlands
Sport in Assen
Football clubs in Drenthe